(sometimes shortened to )  is Japan’s largest cultural festival which aims to provide the Japanese public with the opportunity to present various cultural activities. There is an emphasis on activities by local performers to motivate individuals to participate in cultural activities, encourage culture, inspire the development of local culture and enrich the lives of the people. These events are hosted by the Agency for Cultural Affairs and the prefectural or municipal government, cultural organizations or other related organizations. Shin Koyamada played the lead character of Makibi featured during the on-stage opening ceremony of Okayama 2010 (The 25th National Cultural Festival Okayama 2010), which was held in Momotaro Arena on October 30, 2010.

Features 
Overall festival: includes an opening festival which indicates the direction of new trends in amateur cultural activities
Symposiums: keynote lectures, panel discussions, and other events which explore diverse topics related to trends in Japanese culture, including amateur and regional cultural activities
Genre-specific festivals: Performances, exhibitions, and other events are presented (with a focus on groups nominated by prefectural governments) in genres such as folk, orchestral and choral music, brass-band music, drama, literature, arts, dance, traditional Japanese music and every-day culture.
Cooperative festivals: those complying with the objectives of the National Cultural Festival and hosted by local governments, culture-related groups, corporations and other organizations nationwide. They consist of performances, contests, festivals, exhibitions, classes, and other events.

Host prefectures 

1986 - Tokyo (1st Festival)
1987 - Kumamoto (2nd)
1988 - Hyogo (3rd)
1989 - Saitama (4th)
1990 - Ehime (5th)
1991 - Chiba (6th)
1992 - Ishikawa (7th)
1993 - Iwate (8th)
1994 - Mie (9th)
1995 - Tochigi (10th)
1996 - Toyama (11th)
1997 - Kagawa (12th)
1998 - Oita (13th)
1999 - Gifu (14th)
2000 - Hiroshima (15th)
2001 - Gunma (16th)
2002 - Tottori (17th)
2003 - Yamagata (18th)
2004 - Fukuoka (19th)
2005 - Fukui (20th)
2006 - Yamaguchi (21st)
2007 - Tokushima (22nd)
2008 - Ibaraki (23rd)
2009 - Shizuoka (24th)
2010 - Okayama (25th)

See also 
 Japanese Ministry of Education
 Agency for Cultural Affairs
 The 25th National Cultural Festival Okayama 2010

References

External links
Official website of the National Cultural Festival (Japanese)
Official website of the Agency for Cultural Affairs
Official website of the 25th National Cultural Festival Okayama 2010

Festivals in Japan
Festivals established in 1986
Cultural festivals in Japan